Robert T. Byman (born April 25, 1955) is an American professional golfer who played on the PGA Tour.

Amateur career 
Byman was born in Poughkeepsie, New York. He attended Wake Forest University in Winston-Salem, North Carolina and was a member of the golf team. He played with Jay Haas and Curtis Strange on the 1974 and 1975 teams, which won the NCAA Division I Men's Golf Championships. Golf World has called the 1974–75 teams "the greatest college team of all time". At the end of 1976 Golf Digest ranked Byman the No. 2 amateur in the country behind only Scott Simpson.

Professional career 
Byman turned pro in 1976. He spent the early part of his professional career playing on the European Tour, where he had a great deal of success, winning four times. Tiger Woods is the only American golfer with more regular European Tour wins. He played full-time on the PGA Tour from 1979–84. His best year was 1979 when he won the Bay Hill Citrus Classic in a playoff against John Schroeder, earned $94,243, and made the cut in all 20 of his starts. His best finish in a major championship was T-7 in the 1979 British Open.

Byman also won the New Zealand Open, an official event on the Australian Tour. Almost uniquely for an American golfer he won more events internationally than domestically.

Byman played on the European Seniors Tour in 2005.

Amateur wins (6)
this list may be incomplete
1971 Colorado Amateur
1972 U.S. Junior Amateur, Colorado Amateur
1973 Colorado Amateur
1976 Northeast Amateur, Rice Planters Amateur

Professional wins (6)

PGA Tour wins (1)

PGA Tour playoff record (1–0)

European Tour wins (4)

*Note: The 1978 Dutch Open was shortened to 54 holes due to a player controversy.

PGA Tour of Australasia wins (1)

Results in major championships

CUT = missed the half-way cut
"T" = tied

See also 

 Spring 1978 PGA Tour Qualifying School graduates

References

External links

The Byman Institute of Advanced Golf Studies

American male golfers
Wake Forest Demon Deacons men's golfers
PGA Tour golfers
European Tour golfers
European Senior Tour golfers
Golfers from New York (state)
Sportspeople from Poughkeepsie, New York
1955 births
Living people